Sydney Football Club Youth is the youth system of Sydney Football Club based in Moore Park, Sydney, Australia. The team referred to as Sydney Youth play in the Y-League (November to February) and consists of u23 players, the highest level of youth soccer in Australia. The club also competes in the National Premier Leagues NSW (March to August), the top competition of Football in NSW, however this team is known as Sydney U21, and is not to be confused with Sydney Youth which is a completely different team, involving different team selection and age group.

The youth setup also features under-20s and under-18s teams that both play in the National Premier Leagues NSW in their age group.

Youth team history

Early years (2008–2009)
The youth team was founded in 2008, as a Sydney FC representative team for the National Youth League (NYL) competition. The team consisted of twelve contracted youth positions with four overage players (from the senior squad) allowed to participate in games. The side had initially contracted Football Superstar winner, Adam Hett, but had to be replaced for the campaign due to a season ending knee injury. In its first season Sydney FC Youth won the 2008–09 NYL Championship, with former Socceroo & NSL stalwart, Steve O'Connor as the coach. Throughout the season the side dominated many games and finished the regular season on top of the ladder with 13 wins, 2 draws, 3 losses and 6 points clear of second-placed Adelaide United Youth. The pair then went straight to a Grand Final match, of which Sydney FC Youth emphatically took out the tournament with a 2–0 victory at Hindmarsh Stadium, Adelaide. The goalscorers were Ibrahim Haydar and Robbie Mileski. Many of the Sydney FC Youth players in the Grand Final went on to have success for the senior squad or found a home elsewhere. They included Vedran Janjetovic, Rhyan Grant, Matt Jurman, Antony Golec and Brendan Gan. Sydney FC Youth were unable to follow it up the following year, finishing fifth on the ladder and missing out on the finals series due to goal difference (behind Gold Coast United FC Youth, who went on to win the Championship).

Managers success (2009–2015)
After the second season, club legend Steve Corica replaced Steve O'Connor as head coach. The team had mixed success finishing fourth on the standings with 30 points behind Gold Coast United FC Youth on 41 points. The competition did not have a finals series for the first time. A few players from this cohort went on to play for the first team, including Dimitri Petratos, Nathan Sherlock, Joel Chianese and Blake Powell. To take up a more senior assistant role with the first team, Corica relinquished the head coach position for the 2011–12 season. He was replaced by Ian Crook. Again Sydney FC Youth were mid-table, finishing sixth. Crook himself went on to bigger things the following year, taking over head coach duties for the first team. Brian Dene came in as coach of the Youth team. The season became Sydney FC Youth's worst performance in the team's five-year history, finishing ninth. With the first team also struggling with performance and injuries, many of the Youth team played up in the first's team, which did not help the cause. Some of these players included Christopher Naumoff, Hagi Gligor, Peter Triantis and Aaron Calver. Steve Corica then returned as head coach for Sydney FC Youth with immediate success. The side won the Foxtel National Youth League Championship for the 2013–14 season. Unable to repeat this performance the following year, Corica again relinquished his duties as head coach to focus on his role within the senior squad.

Entry into National Premier Leagues (2014–present)
In early 2015, it was confirmed that Sydney FC would compete in the NPL NSW 2 competition from the 2016 season onwards. This followed a competition review by Football NSW that recommended the youth teams of Sydney FC, Western Sydney Wanderers and Central Coast Mariners join the National Premier Leagues. Along with a team playing first grade, an under-20 and under-18 team would also compete in their appropriate age groups. The team forms the top level of the Sydney FC academy, unveiled in January 2016. Rob Stanton took over the reins as head coach due to the heavily increased workload of the new competition. In the new National Youth League format with a shortened season, Sydney FC Youth started out of the block early recording three consecutive wins. Through the ten round campaign, the team lost only two games, both against Newcastle Jets Youth. The team sat two points clear of Newcastle to end the regular season in first place for Conference B. As Conference B winners, Sydney FC Youth played Adelaide United Youth for the premiership in a curtain raiser to A-League Round 16 match between Central Coast Mariners and Western Sydney Wanderers on 23 January 2016. Sydney FC Youth were convincing winners, taking out the premiership with a scoreline of 5–2.

Many influential faces returned for the debut of the team in the National Premier Leagues setup for Sydney U21. These included, Spyrakis, Timotheou, Araujo, Burgess, Lokolingoy and Antoniou. Notable exceptions included Anthony Bouzanis, Aaron Calver and George Blackwood as they had also signed senior contracts and were ineligible for the tournament. The team's debut match did not go according to plan, losing to Mounties FC 2–0 at home (Lambert Park). The side then went on a thrilling ten-game winning streak, that included some big wins (7–0 against Macarthur Rams and 7–4 against Bankstown Berries). The streak ended in somewhat unfortunate circumstances against Marconi Stallions as Sydney FC U21, after leading 1–0, allowed in two goals in last five minutes of the Round 12 clash to lose 2–1. The following game saw another defeat for the Sky Blues, suffering defeat in the "mini derby" against rivals Western Sydney Wanderers U21. A win, then a draw to Mounties FC in the Round 14 make-up game, then two more losses, meant Sydney FC U21 only picked up four points out of a possible 24, with title hopes looking shaky. However, Sydney FC U21 would get back on track with wins against Bankstown City Lions FC and St George FC. Sydney FC U21 remained undefeated in the final four rounds of the regular season to win the Premiers Plate, two points ahead of Western Sydney Wanderers U21. In fact, the final day was a very tense affair, as the two clubs were matched up against each other. The Wanderers, who were trailing by 3 points and −10 points differential needed a very large win to leap-frog the Sky Blues. However, the sides played out a 4–all draw at Popondetta Park and Sydney FC U21 were declared premiers.

Under-23s current squad
These players can also play with the senior squad and are all Young Professionals.

Under-20s current squadThese players can also play with the senior squad and the Under-23s.

Second years

First years

Schoolboys

Stadium
The team's home grounds for NYL matches are Leichhardt Oval and Netstrata Jubilee Stadium. The team’s home ground is Lambert Park in the suburb of Leichhardt for NPL matches. Also the team’s alternate ground is Valentine Sports Park in the suburb of Glenwood for NPL matches. The teams also shares Sydney FC's club's training base at Macquarie University in North Ryde.

Club officials
Current staff

First team coaches (NPL/NYL)

Seasons

1 Top scorer only includes goals scored from league matches (National Youth League and NYL Finals or National Premier Leagues).

Honours
Domestic
Youth
 NSW NPL 2/NSW League One Premiership
 Premiers (1): 2016
 NSW NPL 2/NSW League One Championship
 Champions (1): 2016

 Y-League/A-League Youth Premiership
 Winners (4): 2008–09, 2013–14, 2015–16, 2016–17, 2019–20 Runners-up (2): 2017–18, 2018–19
 Y-League/A-League Youth Championship Winners (2): 2008–09, 2015–16, 2019–20 Runners-up (1): 2016–17

Academy
 National Premier Leagues NSW U-20 Premiership Runners-up (1): 2018
 National Premier Leagues NSW U-20 Championship Winners (1): 2016 Runners-up (1): 2018
 National Premier Leagues NSW 2 U-20 Premiership Winners (1): 2016 National Premier Leagues NSW U-18 Premiership Winners (2): 2017, 2018 National Premier Leagues NSW 2 U-18 Premiership Runners-up (1): 2016
 National Premier Leagues NSW U-18 Championship Winners (2): 2017, 2018 Runners-up (1): 2016

International
Youth

 International U-21 Thanh Niên Newspaper Cup
 Runners-Up (1): 2013
 Third-place (1): 2012
 Free Trade Port trophy
 Winners (1): 2018 (representing Team Australia along with Newcastle Jets)

Under-20s
 Future Cup (U-17 Tournament)
 Fifth Place (1): 2018

Other
 Individual
 NPL First team Player of the Year: Jaiden Kucharski (2022)
 NPL U-20's Player of the Year:' Luka Smyth (2022)

See also
 Sydney FC

References

External links

Sydney FC
National Premier Leagues clubs
Soccer clubs in Sydney
Association football clubs established in 2008
2008 establishments in Australia
A-League National Youth League